"Loosen' Control" is a song from American rapper Snoop Dogg from his fifth album, Tha Last Meal. It was produced by Soopafly and Master P,  and it features singer Butch Cassidy. The single was released in May 2001.

Track listing

Credits 
Credits adapted from Discogs.

 Executive-producer – Master P
 Mastered By – Brian "Big Bass" Gardner
 Mixed By – Tracey Brown
 Producer – Soopafly
 Written-By – C. Broadus, C. Reid, D. Means, H. Azor, P. Brooks, S. Brown

Notes 

Snoop Dogg songs
2001 singles
2001 songs
Songs written by Snoop Dogg